Israel competed at the 2001 Summer Universiade also known as the XX Summer Universiade, in Palma de Mallorca, Spain.

Medals

Medals by sport

Athletics

Men's

References

Summer Universiade
Israel at the Summer Universiade
Israel